Carposina fernaldana, the currant fruitworm moth, is a moth in the Carposinidae family. It was described by August Busck in 1907. It is found in North America, where it is found from Quebec, along the Mississippi drainage, to Missouri.

The wingspan is 15–20 mm.

The larvae feed on Crataegus and Ribes species.

Etymology
The species is named in honour of Charles H. Fernald.

References

Natural History Museum Lepidoptera generic names catalog

Carposinidae
Moths described in 1907
Taxa named by Thomas de Grey, 6th Baron Walsingham
Moths of North America